Daantjie is a given name. Notable people with the name include:

Daantjie Badenhorst (born 1967), South African quiz show champion, journalist, and author
Daantjie Rossouw (1930–2010), South African rugby union footballer

Masculine given names